Bobbahn is a steel bobsled roller coaster at Heide Park that opened in 1993.
The 826 m long journey begins with a lift hill that transports passengers to a height of 27 m. Then it goes through numerous very tight bends, some dark ride passages, as well as some block brakes until the final brake is reached. A second lift hill brings the trains back to the level of the station.

References